Karl Kaal (30 September 1883 Võisiku Parish, Viljandi County – 24 April 1942) was an Estonian politician. He was a member of III Riigikogu. He was a member of the Riigikogu since 23 January 1928. He replaced Johannes-Rudolf Norman.

References

1883 births
1942 deaths
Members of the Riigikogu, 1926–1929